Divya Pillai is an Indian actress who appears in Malayalam films. She debuted in the 2015 film Ayal Njanalla, it was followed by Oozham in 2016.

Early life
Divya was born to a Malayali family. Born and brought up in Dubai, UAE, she began her career as an airline staff member before entering the cinema world.

Career
She made her film debut in 2015 with the romantic-comedy Ayal Njanalla opposite Fahadh Faasil, in the directorial debut of actor Vineeth Kumar. Her second project was under the direction of Jeethu Joseph in Oozham (2016), a revenge-drama starring Prithviraj Sukumaran. The film was a box office success. In 2019 she had a guest role as Jancy in the television serial Uppum Mulakum.

Filmography

Television

References

External links
 

Living people
1988 births
People from Dubai
Actresses in Malayalam cinema
Actresses in Tamil cinema
Actresses in Malayalam television
Indian expatriates in the United Arab Emirates
Indian film actresses
21st-century Indian actresses
Actresses in Kannada cinema
Actresses in Telugu cinema